Jens Kask (April 20, 1966 – January 15, 2011) was a Swedish Paralympic ice sledge hockey player. He won one gold medal and two bronze medals for Sweden, and was captain of the Swedish team for many years. He served as his country's flag bearer at the 2010 Winter Paralympics opening ceremony.

When Kask was ten years old, he climbed up on the roof of a parked train, where he got an electric shock. As a result, he had to have both his legs amputated.

He died in his home outside of Stockholm in January 2011, 44 years old.

References 

Athlete Search Results - Kask, Jens, International Paralympic Committee (IPC)

External links 
pictures at shif.se
pictures at talleesavage.wordpress.com

1966 births
2011 deaths
Paralympic sledge hockey players of Sweden
Swedish sledge hockey players
Ice sledge hockey players at the 1994 Winter Paralympics
Ice sledge hockey players at the 1998 Winter Paralympics
Ice sledge hockey players at the 2002 Winter Paralympics
Ice sledge hockey players at the 2006 Winter Paralympics
Ice sledge hockey players at the 2010 Winter Paralympics
Paralympic gold medalists for Sweden
Paralympic bronze medalists for Sweden
Medalists at the 1994 Winter Paralympics
Medalists at the 1998 Winter Paralympics
Paralympic medalists in sledge hockey
Swedish amputees
20th-century Swedish people
21st-century Swedish people